Cui bono?, in English  "to whom is it a benefit?", is a Latin phrase about identifying crime suspects. It expresses the view that crimes are often committed to benefit their perpetrators, especially financially.

Usage 
The phrase is a double dative construction. It can also be rendered as cui prodest? ("whom does it profit?") and ad cuius bonum? ("for whose good?").

Background 

Another example of Cicero using Cui bono is in his defence of Sextus Roscius, in the Pro Roscio Amerino, once again invoking Cassius as the source: "Let that maxim of Cassius apply."

American sociologist Peter Blau has used the concept of cui bono to differentiate organizations by who has primarily benefited: owners; members; specific others; or the general society.

See also 
 Cherchez la femme
 Follow the money
Milgram experiment
 Whodunit

General:
Brocard (law)
 List of Latin phrases
 List of legal Latin terms

References 

Adages
Criminology
Conflict of interest
Latin legal terminology